Calamity Anne's Love Affair is a 1914 American silent short Western directed by Tom Ricketts starring Charlotte Burton and Louise Lester as Calamity Anne. Also starring George Field, Edith Borella and B. Reeves Eason.  It is the final film in the Calamity Anne series.

External links
 

1914 films
1914 Western (genre) films
American silent short films
American black-and-white films
Love Affair
Silent American Western (genre) films
Films directed by Tom Ricketts
1910s American films
1910s English-language films